Tidewater, Inc. is a publicly traded international petroleum service company headquartered in Houston,Texas, U.S. It operates a fleet of ships, primarily providing vessels and marine services to the offshore petroleum and offshore wind industries. 
 
Tidewater created the "work boat" industry with its 1956 launch of the Ebb Tide, the world's first vessel tailor-made to support the offshore oil and gas industry. Today, Tidewater is the leading and most experienced provider of OSVs in the global energy industry.  
 
Tidewater has a global footprint, with over 90% of its fleet working internationally in more than 60 countries. Around the world, Tidewater transports crews and supplies, tow and anchor mobile rigs, assists in offshore construction projects and performs a variety of specialized marine support services.

Quintin V. Kneen is the company's president, CEO & Director. The company was founded in 1956 by a group of investors led by the Laborde family.

References

Companies listed on the New York Stock Exchange
Transport companies established in 1955
Shipping companies of the United States
Companies based in New Orleans
1955 establishments in Texas